The 2016 Judo Grand Prix Zagreb was held at the Dom Sportova in Zagreb, Croatia from 23 to 25 September 2016.

Medal summary

Men's events

Women's events

Source Results

Medal table

References

External links
 

2016 IJF World Tour
2016 Judo Grand Prix
Grand Prix 2016
Judo
Judo
Judo
Judo